Black Creek may refer to:

Communities

In Canada
 Black Creek, British Columbia, on Vancouver Island
 A neighborhood in Fort Erie, Ontario
 Black Creek, Toronto
 Black Creek Pioneer Village, a historic site in Toronto

In the United States
 Black Creek, New York, a hamlet in Allegany County
 Black Creek, North Carolina, a town in Wilson County
 Black Creek Township, Mercer County, Ohio
 Black Creek Township, Luzerne County, Pennsylvania
 Black Creek, Wisconsin, a village in Outagamie County
 Black Creek (town), Wisconsin, a town in Outagamie County

Streams

In Canada
 Black Creek (Ontario), one of 37 creeks of that name in Ontario, including:
Black Creek (Toronto), a tributary of the Humber River

In the United States
 Black Creek (Arizona), a tributary of the Puerco River, northeast Arizona
 Black Creek (Florida), a tributary of the St. Johns River in Clay County
 Black Creek (Ogeechee River tributary), a stream in Georgia
 Black Creek (Savannah River tributary), a tributary of the Savannah River in Georgia
 Black Creek (Minnesota)
 Black Creek (South Grand River tributary), a stream in Missouri
 Black Creek (North Fork Salt River tributary), a stream in Missouri
 Black Creek (New Jersey), a tributary of Pochuck and Wawayanda creeks
 Black Creek (Bozen Kill), a tributary of the Bozen Kill in New York state
 Black Creek (Genesee River), a tributary of the Genesee River in New York state
 Black Creek (Hudson River), a tributary of the Hudson River in Ulster County, New York state
 Black Creek (Pennsylvania), a list of Black Creek streams in Pennsylvania including, but not limited to:
 Black Creek (Lehigh River), a stream in Carbon County, Pennsylvania
 Black Creek (Nescopeck Creek), a tributary of Nescopeck Creek in Luzerne County, Pennsylvania
 Black Creek (Susquehanna River), a stream in Luzerne County, Pennsylvania

Other
 Black Creek Park, in Monroe County, New York, USA
 Black Creek Nature Sanctuary, Keweenaw County, Michigan, USA
 Black Creek Wilderness, Mississippi, USA
 Black Creek Drive, a road that runs through Black Creek, Toronto, Canada

See also
 
 Black River (disambiguation)
 Black Brook (disambiguation)
 Ribeirão Preto